Herb LaFontaine is a Canadian retired ice hockey defenceman who starred for Rensselaer.

Career
LaFontaine played two seasons for Rensselaer as the team was ascending to the top of the college hockey landscape. In each of his two campaigns, the Engineers finished atop the Tri-State League standings and ended the year with 15 wins. For his second year with the program LaFontaine was named team captain and he led the Engineers to their first NCAA Tournament appearance. RPI lost a close contest with Minnesota in the semifinal then defeated Boston College in the consolation game. For his performance during the season, LaFontaine was an AHCA First Team All-American and made the All-Tournament Second Team.

Statistics

Regular season and playoffs

Awards and honors

References

External links

Year of birth unknown
Canadian ice hockey defencemen
Ice hockey people from Quebec
People from Westmount, Quebec
RPI Engineers men's ice hockey players
AHCA Division I men's ice hockey All-Americans